Glycine viscosa  may refer to two different species of plants:
 Glycine viscosa Moench, a synonym for Bolusafra bituminosa
 Glycine viscosa Roth., a synonym for Rhynchosia viscosa